Eric Morales Martinez (born May 3, 1972) is a Filipino politician who is currently a member of House of Representatives from Valenzuela's 2nd district since 2016 and he was the House Deputy Speaker for 18th Congress from 2020 to 2022.

Personal life 
Martinez was born in Barangay Marulas, Valenzuela on May 3, 1972. He was president of Liturgy of Music of National Shrine of Our Lady of Fatima on year 1995 and a music teacher at St. Patrick School from 1997 to 1998. He also became Board of Director of Philippine National Red Cross of Valenzuela Chapter. He attained Bachelor of Science in Business Administration at University of Santo Tomas and both primary and secondary education at Notre Dame of Greater Manila.

Political career 
Martinez first served in Barangay Marulas, Valenzuela as member of Sangguniang Kabataan from 1993 to 1997 and as barangay kagawad from 1997 to 2001. He was later elected councilor of Valenzuela from the 2nd district in 2001, serving for two terms until 2007.

Vice Mayor 
On 2007, Martinez won his first term as Vice Mayor of Valenzuela City together with re-elected mayor Win Gatchalian. On 2010, Martinez seek for his second term as vice mayor while Win Gatchalian seek for his third term as mayor of the city. Both of them won the local election. On 2013, he ran again for his third term as vice mayor of the city while former mayor Win Gatchalian ran as representative of Valenzuela's 2nd district because he is unable to run for the position once more due to being term limited. Instead, his brother Rex Gatchalian won 2013 Valenzuela local elections as mayor of the city.

Representative for the 17th to 19th Congress

17th Congress 
On 2016, Martinez was elected for his first term as representative for Valenzuela's 2nd district representative.

18th Congress 
On 2019, he was re-elected representative for Valenzuela's 2nd district representative, defeating his predecessor Magi Gunigundo.

On July 10, 2020, Martinez voted to reject the franchise renewal of ABS-CBN together with Valenzuela's 1st district representative Wes Gatchalian and 68 other congressmen. On October 6, 2020, Martinez was removed as chairman of the House committee on youth and sports development.

19th Congress 
On 2022, Martinez seek for re-election for his third and last term as Valenzuela's 2nd district representative. His candidacy received endorsement from President Rodrigo Duterte, which was a big help for his victory. He was re-elected to his third term in 2022, beating former representative Magi Gunigundo once again.

References 

Living people
1972 births
Filipino educators
Members of the House of Representatives of the Philippines from Valenzuela, Metro Manila
Metro Manila city and municipal councilors
People from Valenzuela, Metro Manila
PDP–Laban politicians
Liberal Party (Philippines) politicians
University of Santo Tomas alumni